The Eastern Michigan Eagles baseball team (formerly the Eastern Michigan Hurons) is a varsity intercollegiate athletic team of Eastern Michigan University in Ypsilanti, Michigan, United States. The team is a member of the Mid-American Conference West division, which is part of the National Collegiate Athletic Association's Division I. Eastern Michigan's first baseball team was fielded in 1901. The team plays its home games at Oestrike Stadium in Ypsilanti, Michigan. The 1976 team finished as runner-up at the 1976 College World Series, making the then-Hurons the last northern school to play for a CWS title until Michigan in 2019.

Postseason

See also
 List of NCAA Division I baseball programs

References

External links
 

 
Baseball teams established in 1901
1901 establishments in Michigan